Korie Homan defeated Florence Gravellier in the final, 6–2, 6–2 to win the women's singles wheelchair tennis title at the 2010 Australian Open.

Esther Vergeer was the four-time reigning champion, but did not participate this year.

Seeds
 Korie Homan (champion)
 Florence Gravellier (final)

Draw

Finals

External links
 Main Draw

Wheelchair Women's Singles
Women's Singles 2010